Cephalodasyidae is a family of worms belonging to the order Macrodasyida.

Genera:
 Cephalodasys Remane, 1926
 Dolichodasys Gagne, 1977
 Mesodasys Remane, 1951
 Paradasys  emane, 1934
 Pleurodasys Remane, 1927

References

Gastrotricha